Autumn Leaves is a 1956 American psychological drama film directed by Robert Aldrich and starring Joan Crawford in an older woman/younger man tale of mental illness. The film was distributed by Columbia Pictures. The screenplay was written by Jean Rouverol and Hugo Butler, though it was credited to Jack Jevne (serving as a front), since Rouverol and Butler were blacklisted at the time of the film's release.

The film was and produced by William Goetz. Aldrich won the Silver Bear for Best Director at the 1956 Berlin International Film Festival.

Plot
Spinsterish Millicent "Milly" Wetherby (Joan Crawford) works at home as a self-employed typist. One evening in a diner, she meets a lonely U.S. Army veteran named Burt Hanson (Cliff Robertson). They share a romantic date at the beach, kissing amidst the crashing waves, but Milly tells Burt to date someone his own age. A month later, Burt is waiting for the still-lonely Milly at her home and the two celebrate his new job at a department store. He proposes to her in a movie theater, and while she initially rejects the proposal, she reconsiders when she sees him walking away.

The next day, the couple gets married in Mexico. However, on the marriage license, he lists his place of birth as Chicago, though he had earlier told her he was born in Racine, Wisconsin. Once home, Burt's ex-wife, Virginia (Vera Miles), appears, which shocks Milly because Burt told her that he had never been married. Virginia gives her a property settlement that she wants Burt to sign and tells her that Burt is a habitual liar about his life and his past. Milly also learns that Burt's father (Lorne Greene) is in Los Angeles to find him.

Burt is haunted by the day when he discovered his wife and father making love; he begins displaying signs of mental instability with their sudden, unwelcomed presence in his life. When he becomes violent, Milly sends him to a mental hospital. Burt's condition improves with treatment (depicted sketchily as a montage of intravenous drugs and electroconvulsive therapy), and he severs connections with his past. Milly happily discovers he still loves her and they look forward to a brighter future.

Cast
 Joan Crawford as Millicent Wetherby
 Cliff Robertson as Burt Hanson
 Vera Miles as Virginia Hanson
 Lorne Greene as Mr. Hanson
 Ruth Donnelly as Liz Eckhart
 Sheppard Strudwick as Dr. Malcolm Couzzens
 Selmer Jackson as Mr. Wetherby
 Maxine Cooper as Nurse Evans
 Marjorie Bennett as Waitress
 Frank Gerstle as Mr. Ramsey
 Leonard Mudie as Colonel Hillyer
 Maurice Manson as Mr. Masterson
 Boh Hopkins as Desk Clerk

Production
The film's original working title was The Way We Are. Robert Aldrich originally developed it for his own company, the Associates and Aldrich and it was announced in July 1954, based on an original script by Jack Jevne.

Aldrich got Joan Crawford attached and they sold it to William Goetz who had a deal with Columbia. Filming began on August 25, 1955.

Song
The title was changed from The Way We Are to capitalize on the success of the then popular tune "Autumn Leaves" as sung by Nat King Cole. Crawford's character is fond of the song, but it is not identified by name in the script. Cole's rendition is used over the film's main title sequence and the cast credits at the end.

The song's original title is "Les feuilles mortes" with music by Joseph Kosma and lyrics by Jacques Prévert. English lyrics were written by the American songwriter Johnny Mercer (1949). The song was introduced by Yves Montand in the French feature film Les Portes de la Nuit (1946).

Reception
Although Bosley Crowther panned the film in The New York Times on August 2, 1956, (calling it a "dismal tale"), Lawrence Quirk in Motion Picture Herald and William Zinsser in the New York Herald Tribune commented favorably upon the film.  Autumn Leaves was a modest box-office success, chiefly among Crawford's female fans.

The actress thought highly of the film, deeming it the "best older woman/younger man movie ever made", and added, "Everything clicked on Autumn Leaves. The cast was perfect, the script was good, and I think Bob [Aldrich] handled everything well. I really think Cliff did a stupendous job; another actor might have been spitting out his lines and chewing the scenery, but he avoided that trap. I think the movie on a whole was a lot better than some of the romantic movies I did in the past...but somehow it just never became better known. It was eclipsed by the picture I did with Bette Davis."

The film has grown in stature among Aldrich fans since its 1956 premiere and is now regarded as one of the director's best films. Dan Callahan of Slant Magazine (June 16, 2004) wrote, "All of Aldrich's early work is intriguing, but Autumn Leaves is his secret gem. It's been passed over as camp because of its star, Joan Crawford, but Aldrich brings all his hard edges to this woman's picture. The collision of his tough style with the soapy material makes for a film that never loses its queasy tension."

Crawford and Aldrich announced plans to make another film together Storm in the Sun but these plans faltered when Aldrich had a falling out with Columbia. However the two worked together again on Whatever Happened to Baby Jane? (1962).

Awards
 Silver Bear for Best Director (Aldrich), Berlin International Film Festival 1956.

See also
Mental illness in films
List of American films of 1956

References

External links
 
 
 
 

1956 films
1956 drama films
American drama films
American black-and-white films
Columbia Pictures films
1950s English-language films
Films directed by Robert Aldrich
Films shot in Los Angeles
Films scored by Hans J. Salter
Films about schizophrenia
1950s American films